Viktor Nosov (19 July 1940 – 17 April 2008) was a Soviet footballer and coach. He is recognized as a Master of Sports of the Soviet Union and Merited Coach of Ukraine. While being led by Nosov, in 1979-1985 Shakhtar Donetsk won two Soviet Cups and became a runner-up of the Soviet Top League.

Nosov started out his playing career in 1958 in FC Shakhtar Donetsk. With Shakhtar and SKA Rostov-na-Donu, Nosov played some 88 games at the Soviet Top League.

He retired in 1972 with FC Budivelnyk Poltava. The same year he became a coach for FC Shakhtar Makiivka. Sometimes at the end of 1980s he coached Victory Sports Club from Maldives. With the fall of the Soviet Union, Nosov stayed in Ukraine and continued to coach Ukrainian teams.

In the beginning of April 2008 Nosov was hospitalized with abdominal angina at the Husak Institute of Urgent and Reconstructive Surgery in Donetsk. However soon after his surgery, he died.

External links
 Orel, T. In his 50s the illustrious coach of Donetsk "Shakhtar" Victor Nosov had gone nowhere. He lived in the basement, selling light bulbs, laces and shoe creams. Up to his own death his son called him with threats: "All the same, I'll kill you!". "Bulvar Gordona". 25 July 2008.
 Viktor Nosov on footballfacts.ru

1940 births
2008 deaths
Footballers from Donetsk
Soviet footballers
FC Shakhtar Donetsk players
FC Lokomotyv Donetsk players
FC SKA Rostov-on-Don players
FC Metalist Kharkiv players
FC Vorskla Poltava players
Soviet Top League players
Soviet football managers
Ukrainian football managers
Ukrainian expatriate football managers
Expatriate football managers in the Maldives
FC Shakhtar Makiivka managers
FC Vorskla Poltava managers
FC Shakhtar Donetsk managers
Victory Sports Club managers
Pakhtakor Tashkent FK managers
FC Zorya Luhansk managers
FC Dynamo Stavropol managers
NK Veres Rivne managers
FC Shakhtar-2 Donetsk managers
FC Vorskla-2 Poltava managers
Ukrainian Premier League managers
Association football defenders